Eremite Records is an independent American jazz record label founded in 1995 by Michael Ehlers, with early involvement from music writer Byron Coley. Ehlers was a student of Archie Shepp's at the University of Massachusetts Amherst. After college, he began producing concerts in the Amherst area, and Eremite evolved from those events. The label name came from an alternate title to the Thelonious Monk tune "Reflections": "Portrait of an Eremite". The label's logo, designed by Savage Pencil, is an image of a robed Joe McPhee playing soprano saxophone. Eremite organized a concert series in Western Massachusetts that ran through 2008 and produced roughly 100 concerts, including five Fire in the Valley festivals. From 1998–2018, Eremite managed a touring organization that arranged hundreds of concerts across North America for its artists.

Eremite Records' early activities emphasized music by first and second generation musicians working in the American and international free jazz traditions, including drummers Denis Charles, Sunny Murray, and Juma Sultan, saxophonists Fred Anderson, Peter Brötzmann, Kidd Jordan, Sabir Mateen, and Jemeel Moondoc, trumpeter Raphe Malik, and bassists Alan Silva and William Parker. Starting in 2002, Eremite collaborated with Peter Brötzmann to revive Brötzmann's personal imprint Brö Records. After relocating from Western Massachusetts in 2009, Eremite began collaborating with a younger generation of musicians, including multi-instrumentalist Joshua Abrams and guitarist Jeff Parker. In 2021, Ehlers began working with the Black Editions Group, Los Angeles, on Black Editions Archive, an imprint focused on previously unreleased works by Milford Graves.

Eremite releases have appeared in many best-of-year lists, including The Washington Post, The New York Times, The Chicago Tribune, The Wire, Rolling Stone, DownBeat, Jazz Times, and Aquarium Drunkard.

Concerning his involvement with Eremite, Sunny Murray stated the following: 
"This music has not established many real connoisseurs, men with quality and taste, so we get a lot of meatheads that are in control of the business... When a guy comes up, we're suspicious... we've... dealt with so many Frankensteins that we want to make sure this guy is not a Frankenstein... Michael's not a Frankenstein—Michael Ehlers, Eremite Records—he'll take a chance. And that's what made this business work, guys that took chances."

Releases
 MTE-01	Jemeel Moondoc - Tri-P-Let
 MTE-02 	Ellery Eskelin & Andrea Parkins - Green Bermudas
 MTE-03	Gregg Bendian - Interzone
 MTE-04 	Assif Tsahar - Shekina
 MTE-05	Raphe Malik - The Short Form
 MTE-06 	Christopher Cauley - FINland
 MTE-07	Tom Bruno & Sabir Mateen - Getting Away with Murder
 MTE-08 	Jemeel Moondoc - Fire in the Valley
 MTE-09	Denis Charles - Captain of the Deep
 MTE-10 	Trio Hurricane - Live at Fire in the Valley
 MTE-11	Sabir Mateen - Divine Mad Love
 MTE-12 	William Parker - Through Acceptance of the Mystery Peace
 MTE-13	Raphe Malik - ConSequences
 MTE-14 	Sunny Murray with Sabir Mateen - We Are Not at the Opera
 MTE-15	Glenn Spearman - First and Last
 MTE-16 	Malcolm Goldstein - Live at Fire in the Valley
 MTE-17	Alan Silva & William Parker - A Hero's Welcome: Pieces for Rare Occasions
 MTE-18 	Peter Brötzmann Die Like a Dog Quartet - From Valley to Valley
 MTE-19	Noah Howard - Patterns/Message To South Africa
 MTE-20 	Jemeel Moondoc & William Parker  - New World Pygmies
 MTE-21	Test - Live/Test
 MTE-22 	Tom Bruno - White Boy Blues
 MTE-23/24 Fred Anderson Hamid Drake, Kidd Jordan, William Parker - 2 Days in April
 MTE-25	Marco Eneidi, William Parker, Donald Robinson - Cherry Box
 MTE-26 	Alan Silva & The Sound Visions Orchestra - Alan Silva & the Sound Visions Orchestra
 MTE-27	Alan Silva & Oluyemi Thomas - Transmissions
 MTE-28 	Jemeel Moondoc - Revolt of the Negro Lawn Jockeys
 MTE-29	Jemeel Moondoc and the Jus Grew Orchestra - Spirit House
 MTE-30/31 Jemeel Moondoc & William Parker with Hamid Drake - New World Pygmies vol. 2
 MTE-32/33 William Parker Clarinet Trio - Bob's Pink Cadillac
 MTE-34	Raphe Malik - Companions
 MTE-35	Hamid Drake & Sabir Mateen - Brothers Together
 MTE-36 	William Parker & The Little Huey Creative Music Orchestra - Raincoat in the River
 MTE-37/38 Peter Brötzmann, Hamid Drake, William Parker - Never Too Late But Always Too Early
 MTE-39/40/41/42	Alan Silva - H.Con.Res.57/Treasure Box
 MTE-43 	Jemeel Moondoc with Denis Charles - We Don't
 MTE-44 Marshall Allen, Hamid Drake, Kidd Jordan, William Parker, Alan Silva - The All-Star Game
 MTE-45	Sunny Murray - Perles Noires vol. 1
 MTE-46	Sunny Murray - Perles Noires vol. 2
 MTE-47/48 Fred Anderson, Hamid Drake, William Parker - Blue Winter
 MTE-49 John Blum - John Blum Astrogeny Quartet
 MTE-50 	Khan Jamal Creative Arts Ensemble - Drum Dance to the Motherland
 MTE-51 	Sunny Murray - Big Chief
 MTE-52 	Solidarity Unit, Inc. - Red, Black & Green
 MTE-53 	Joshua Abrams - Natural Information (LP)
 MTE-54/55/56 	Juma Sultan's Aboriginal Music Society - Father of Origin
 MTE-57 	Juma Sultan's Aboriginal Music Society/Joshua Abrams - AMS dub
 MTE-58 	Joshua Abrams - Represencing (LP)
 MTE-59/60 	Test - Always Coming From the Love Side
 MTE-61 	Joshua Abrams - Natural Information (Deluxe CD)
 MTE-62 Joshua Abrams - Represencing (Deluxe CD)
 MTE-63/64 Joshua Abrams - Magnetoception
MTE-65 Jeff Parker - Slight Freedom
 MTE-67 Joshua Abrams - Music for Life Itself & The Interrupters
 MTE-68 Joshua Abrams & Natural Information Society - Simultonality
 MTE-69 	The Khan Jamal Creative Arts Ensemble - Drum Dance to the Motherland
 MTE-70/71 	Joshua Abrams & Natural Information Society - Mandatory Reality (LP)
 MTE-71/72 	Joshua Abrams & Natural Information Society - Mandatory Reality (CD)
 MTE-73	David Blue - Stories
 MTE-74/75 	Natural Information Society with Evan Parker - descension (Out of Our Constrictions)
 MTE-76/77  Jeff Parker ETA IVtet - Mondays at Enfield Tennis Academy
 MTE-78/79  Natural Information Society - Since Time Is Gravity

References

External links 
 Official site

American record labels
Jazz record labels
Record labels established in 1995